Duanbolan is a town in Jimo District, Qingdao, Shandong province, China. , it has 69 villages under its administration: 
Duanbolan First Village
Duanbolan Second Village
Duanbolan Third Village
Duanbolan Fourth Village
Sunjiahouzhai Village
Jiangjiazhuang Village
Maojialing First Village
Maojialing Second Village
Maojialing Third Village
Maojialing Fourth Village
Shihuiyao Village
Chenggezhuang First Village
Chenggezhuang Second Village
Chenggezhuang Third Village
Liujiayingli Village
Lilin Village
Houbu Village
Guanlubu Village
Huaishugou Village
Yejiazhaike Village
Ligezhuang Village
Dongwagezhuang First Village
Dongwagezhuang Second Village
Dongwagezhuang Third Village
Xiwagezhuang Village
Waqianzhuang Village
Menggezhuang Village
Lanshang Village
Maobu Village
Sanjia Village
Shijiajie Village
Dongdayuzhuang Village
Xidayuzhuang Village
Wangxinzhuang Village
Lanbu Village
Maogezhuang Village
Guojiatuan Village
Linghou Village
Lanxitou Village
Dongzhangjiabu Village
Xizhangjiabu Village
Jiangjiapo Village
Liujiazhuang First Village
Liujiazhuang Second Village
Liujiazhuang Third Village
Liujiazhuang Fourth Village
Liujiazhuang Fifth Village
Qiaogezhuang Village
Chenggezhuang Village
Zhaogezhuang Village
Budong Village
Gaojialing Village
Jiajiahoutuan Village
Chengjiazhuang Village
Sunjiatun Village
Zhangguanzhuang Village
Xijianzhuang Village
Dongjianzhuang Village
Dalügezhuang First Village
Dalügezhuang Second Village
Dalügezhuang Third Village
Xiaolügezhuang Village
Dahubu Village
Tiangongyuan Village
Yuanjiazhuang Village
Fanggezhuang Village
Maigezhuang Village
Qigezhuang Village
Xuejiaquanzhuang Village

See also 
 List of township-level divisions of Shandong

References 

Township-level divisions of Shandong
Geography of Qingdao
Towns in China